Richard Wilhelm Julius Körner (22 December 1870 in Sülldorf– 19 November 1954 in Blankenese) was a German rower who competed in the 1900 Summer Olympics. He was part of the German crew who won the bronze medal in the coxed fours final A.

References

External links

 
 

1870 births
1954 deaths
Olympic rowers of Germany
Rowers at the 1900 Summer Olympics
Olympic bronze medalists for Germany
Olympic medalists in rowing
German male rowers
Medalists at the 1900 Summer Olympics
People from Altona, Hamburg
Rowers from Hamburg